Rebecca Anne Hedwig Waldecker (born 1979) is a German mathematician specializing in group theory. She is professor for algebra at Martin Luther University of Halle-Wittenberg.

Education and career
Waldecker is originally from Aachen.

After postdoctoral research as a Leverhulme Fellow at the University of Birmingham, Waldecker joined Martin Luther University of Halle-Wittenberg as a junior professor in 2009. She became professor for algebra in 2015.

Books
Waldecker is the author of the book Isolated Involutions in Finite Groups (Memoirs of the American Mathematical Society, 2013), developed from her doctoral dissertation.

With Lasse Rempe-Gillen, she is the coauthor of Primzahltests für Einsteiger: Zahlentheorie, Algorithmik, Kryptographie (Vieweg+Teubner, 2009; 2nd ed., Springer, 2016), a book on primality tests that was translated into English as Primality Testing for Beginners (Student Mathematical Library 70, American Mathematical Society, 2014).

References

External links
Home page

1979 births
Living people
21st-century German mathematicians
German women mathematicians
Group theorists
University of Kiel alumni
Academic staff of the University of Halle
21st-century women mathematicians
People from Aachen
21st-century German women